George Finn (born January 21, 1990) is a Georgian-American actor. He is best known for his roles in the films LOL, Time Lapse (2014) and Tbilisi, I Love You (2014)

Early life
George Finn was born as Giorgi Agiashvili  in Tbilisi, Georgia into a family of writers and filmmakers. He moved to Los Angeles, California at a young age. Films were the main focus in the family, and Finn soon started to develop a desire to be a part of the industry.

Career
Finn first appeared in a recurring role, as Julian, on Unfabulous from 2004 until 2007. He has subsequently had many guest starring roles since then, appearing on Lincoln Heights (2009), 90210 (2009), How I Met Your Mother (2009–10), Cold Case (2010), and The Mentalist (2014). Finn has had lead roles in several films directed by his brother, Nika Agiashvili, including The Harsh Life of Veronica Lambert (2009), A Green Story (2012) and Tbilisi, I Love You (2014).

He starred as Chad in LOL (2012) alongside Demi Moore and Miley Cyrus, and was one of the lead roles, portraying Jasper, in Time Lapse (2014) alongside Danielle Panabaker and Matt O'Leary. Finn was set to star as the lead in Agiashvili's film, Short Happy Life of Butch Livingston.

Filmography

Film

Television

Web

References

External links
 

1990 births
Living people
Actors from Tbilisi
Male film actors from Georgia (country)
Expatriates from Georgia (country) in the United States